The Anjuman is a stream which runs through the Anjuman Valley in Afghanistan. The stream's sources include the three lakes of the valley, with the largest lake being the primary source.

References

Rivers of Afghanistan